Take A Moment (foaled 18 December 1995) is a Standardbred horse and one of New Zealand's greatest ever trotters.  Racing from 2000 to 2005, he won 39 of his 67 starts, and his overall prize money of $NZ1,164,356 is only bettered by his stablemate Lyell Creek in terms of Australasian trotters.  His biggest wins included two Inter Dominion Trotting Championship Grand Finals, three Dominion Handicaps and a Rowe Cup. He was inducted into the Inter Dominion Hall of Fame.

Major race wins
 2001 Dominion Handicap (Handicap of 10 metres) 
 2001 Inter Dominion Trotting Championship
 2002 Dominion Handicap (Handicap of 10 metres) 
 2003 Dominion Handicap (Handicap of 15 metres) 
 2003 Inter Dominion Trotting Championship
 2003 Rowe Cup

See also
 Harness racing in New Zealand
 Easton Light
 Petite Evander

References

Dominion Handicap winners
Inter Dominion Trotting winners
New Zealand standardbred racehorses
Rowe Cup winners
1995 racehorse births